Antonio Gopal (born 12 January 1947) is a Seychellois hurdler. He competed in the men's 110 metres hurdles at the 1980 Summer Olympics.

References

1947 births
Living people
Athletes (track and field) at the 1980 Summer Olympics
Seychellois male hurdlers
Seychellois Hindus
Olympic athletes of Seychelles
Place of birth missing (living people)
Seychellois people of Indian descent